André Chardar (7 October 1906 – 13 April 1993) was a French international footballer.

Career 
Chardar was born in Buenos Aires in Argentina to French parents. While growing up in the country, he drew in interest to the sport of football and, after his family return to France, joined CA Paris at the age of 13. After spending six years with the club as a youth, Chardar joined US Juvisy. He only spent a season at the club before moving to Sète where he achieved most of his success. With Sète, Chardar won the Coupe de France in 1930 and established himself as a French international. After departing Sète in 1933, he played for a host of clubs before ending his career with Racing Paris in 1938. Chardar later moved into the managerial role engaging in coaching stints with US Métro and his former club CA Paris.

References

External links
 
 

1906 births
1993 deaths
Footballers from Buenos Aires
French footballers
France international footballers
Argentine footballers
Argentine people of French descent
Argentine emigrants to France
FC Sète 34 players
Racing Club de France Football players
Nîmes Olympique players
Olympique Alès players
Valenciennes FC players
Association football defenders
French football managers
Argentine football managers